Margaret Patricia Roberts  (20 April 1921 – 21 August 2013) was a Welsh amateur golfer. She won the Welsh Ladies' Amateur Championship four times between 1956 and 1969.

Golf career
Roberts won the Welsh Ladies' Amateur Championship four times, in 1956, 1959, 1963 and 1969, and was runner-up six times, in 1952, 1955, 1957, 1958, 1962 and 1966.

In 1950, Roberts made her debut for Wales in the Women's Home Internationals. She made her final appearance in 1970, playing every year except 1952 and 1954. She also played for Wales in the 1964 Espirito Santo Trophy, when the four home nations competed separately, and in the European Ladies' Team Championship in 1965 and 1967.

Roberts held a number of positions in the Welsh Ladies' Golf Union, including chairman, secretary and president. She was also a vice captain of Curtis Cup and Vagliano Trophy teams.

Honours
Roberts was appointed a Member of the Order of the British Empire (MBE) in the 1994 New Year Honours as president of the Welsh Ladies' Golf Union, "for services to Golf".

Team appearances
Espirito Santo Trophy (representing Wales): 1964
European Ladies' Team Championship (representing Wales): 1965, 1967
Women's Home Internationals (representing Wales): 1950, 1951, 1953, 1955, 1956, 1957, 1958, 1959, 1960, 1961, 1962, 1963, 1964, 1965, 1966, 1967, 1968, 1969, 1970

References

Welsh female golfers
Amateur golfers
Members of the Order of the British Empire
1921 births
2013 deaths